Adama Smith Dickens (born 28 December 1992) is a Congolese footballer who plays as a midfielder. She played for 1207 Antalya Muratpaşa Belediye Spor in the Turkish Women's First Football League with jersey number 24. She is a member of the Congo women's national football team.

Career

Club
Smith Dickens played in her country for the women's team of the Dolisie-based club AC Léopards.

In 2015, she played a brief time for the Turkish team Trabzon İdmanocağı.

Smith Dickens was transferred by 1207 Antalya Muratpaşa Belediye Spor in January 2016 to play in the second half of the 2015–16 Turkish Women's First Football League.

International
She was admitted to the Congo women's national football team and took part at the women's tournament of the 2015 African Games held in Brazzaville, Republic of the Congo.

Career statistics
.

References

Living people
1992 births
Women's association football midfielders
Republic of the Congo women's international footballers
Republic of the Congo expatriate footballers
Republic of the Congo women's footballers
Expatriate women's footballers in Turkey
Congo
AC Léopards players
Trabzon İdmanocağı women's players
1207 Antalya Spor players